The Brunnstrom Approach sets out a sequence of stages of recovery from hemiplegia after a stroke. It was developed by the Swedish physical therapist Signe Brunnström, and emphasises the synergic pattern of movement which develops during recovery. This approach encourages development of flexor and extensor synergies during early recovery, with the intention that synergic activation of muscles will, with training, transition into voluntary activation of movements.

Sequential motor recovery following stroke
The Brunnstrom Approach follows six proposed stages of sequential motor recovery after a stroke. A patient can plateau at any of these stages, but will generally follow this sequence if he or she makes a full recovery. The variability found between patients depends on the location and severity of the lesion, and the potential for adaptation.

Brunnstrom (1966, 1970) and Sawner (1992) also described the process of recovery following stroke-induced hemiplegia. The process was divided into a number of stages:

Flaccidity (immediately after the onset)
No "voluntary" movements on the affected side can be initiated
Spasticity appears
Basic synergy patterns appear
Minimal voluntary movements may be present
Patient gains voluntary control over synergies
Increase in spasticity
Some movement patterns out of synergy are mastered (synergy patterns still predominate)
Decrease in spasticity
If progress continues, more complex movement combinations are learned as the basic synergies lose their dominance over motor acts
Further decrease in spasticity
Disappearance of spasticity
Individual joint movements become possible and coordination approaches normal
Normal function is restored

The 6 stages are as follows:

Assessment methods
The six component stages of the Brunnstrom Approach have influenced the development of a variety of standardized assessment methods used by physiotherapists and occupational therapists to evaluate and track the progress of persons recovering from stroke. The Fugl Meyer Assessment of Physical Performance (FMA) is an example of one widely used scale. The FMA consists of five sub-scales that relate to various aspects of a patient's upper and lower extremity, and the sub-scales are as follows:
Motor
Balance
Sensation
Joint Range of Motion
Pain
Each component of the FMA may be evaluated and scored individually or, a total possible summative score for all 5 sub-scales of 226 may be used to track a patient's degree of recovery.

The influence of the Brunnstrom Approach on the development of the FMA is most evident within the Motor sub-scale for both the upper and lower extremity where there is a strong emphasis on the evaluation of muscle synergies.

References

Physical therapy